Greatest Hits is a greatest hits album by Shania Twain, released on November 8, 2004 by Mercury Nashville. The album contains seventeen hits from each of all of her studio albums (with the exception of Twain's self-titled debut album), and three new tracks, with each of them becoming singles; "Party for Two", which hit the top ten in US country, UK and Germany, "Don't!" and "I Ain't No Quitter". 

Greatest Hits was commercially successful; It debuted at number two on the Billboard 200 chart and at number one on the Top Country Albums chart with 530,000 copies sold, staying there for 11 consecutive weeks. The album was also the highest selling country album in the US for 2005, and was certified 4× platinum in the US and 3× platinum in the UK. Additionally, Greatest Hits was recognized by Guinness World Records as the fastest-selling greatest hits album by a female artist in the US. As of December 2019, the album has sold 4.4 million copies in the US.

Track listing

Music videos
 "Party for Two"
 "Don't!"
 "I Ain't No Quitter"

Personnel

 Bruce Bouton – pedal steel guitar
 Larry Byrom – electric guitar, acoustic guitar, slide guitar
 Joe Chemay – bass guitar, fretless bass 
 B.J. Cole – dobro, pedal steel guitar
 Billy Crain – slide guitar
 Billy Currington – duet vocals on "Party for Two" (country version)
 Diamond Duggal – percussion
 Simon Duggal – percussion
 Glen Duncan – fiddle
 Stuart Duncan – fiddle
 Larry Franklin – fiddle
 Paul Franklin – pedabro, pedal steel guitar
 Carl Gorodetzky – string contractor
 Gavin Greenaway – string arrangements
 Rob Hajacos – fiddle
 David Hamilton – string arrangements, strings
 Aubrey Haynie – fiddle
 John Hobbs – organ, Wurlitzer
 Dann Huff – six-string bass guitar, 12-string electric guitar, electric guitar, electric sitar, sound effects, talk box guitar, tic tac bass, wah-wah guitar
 Ronn Huff – string arrangements
 John Hughey – pedal steel guitar
 David Hungate – bass guitar
 The Irish Film Orchestra – strings
 John Barlow Jarvis – piano, Wurlitzer 
 Nick Jeca – clapping
 Robert John "Mutt" Lange – clapping, background vocals
 Paul Leim – drums, percussion, door slam
 Mark McGrath – duet vocals on "Party for Two" (pop version)
 Terry McMillan – cowbell, harmonica, harp, stomping
 Carl Marsh – string arrangements, strings
 Brent Mason – electric guitar
 Joey Miskulin – accordion
 The Nashville String Machine – strings 
 Michael Omartian – piano
 Matt Rollings – piano
 Olle Romo – programming
 Joe Spivey – fiddle
 Aurther Stead – organ, piano, Wurlitzer
 Michael Thompson – bouzouki, e-bow, electric guitar, slide guitar
 Shania Twain – clapping, footsteps, lead vocals, background vocals
 Biff Watson – acoustic guitar, electric guitar, nylon string guitar
 John Willis – banjo, bouzouki, acoustic guitar, mandolin
 Jonathan Yudkin – cello, fiddle, mandolin, violin

Charts

Weekly charts

Year-end charts

Certifications

References

2004 greatest hits albums
Shania Twain albums
Albums produced by Robert John "Mutt" Lange
Mercury Records compilation albums
Canadian Country Music Association Top Selling Album albums